Enikő Muri (born 24 April 1990, Nyíregyháza, Hungary) is a Hungarian musical and theatre actress, and singer, most notable for coming in 2nd place on the second season of X-Faktor, the highest placing female contestant for that season.

Life 
Born in Nyíregyháza, Muri was raised in Nagyvarsány. She started singing as a child. In 2006, she took part in a karaoke TV's show on VIVA Hungary, Shibuya, which she won. She then graduated from secondary school in Nyíregyháza and majored in marketing in college. In 2008, she released Szomorú, but was unsuccessful. In 2010, she appeared on the RTL Klub show X-Faktor, but failed. It was a big disappointment for her and almost decided to stop singing, but in 2011, she appeared again in X-Faktor, and this time got into the live broadcast. She was mentored by Feró Nagy, and eventually earned second place, and became a well-known singer. Her first album, consisting of the songs sung from the X-Faktor, was released in 2011, which reached the MAHASZ sales list in second place, and in addition has been certified as a double-platinum album. She also performed at the Madách Theatre in December 2011, and played the role of Márta Vágó, the love interest of Attila József in the play Én, József Attila. In May 2012, she performed with Mária Gór Nagy. She released her first solo album on 27 August 2012, titled Enciklopédia. She also contributed to Attila Dolhai's album Shining. She participated in A Dal 2017, the 2017 of the Hungarian national selection for the Eurovision Song Contest, with the song Jericho. She was eliminated in the third heat.

Discography

Album

Singles/Video clips 
 2012: Késő már
 2012: Botladozva
 2012: Amikor minden összedől
 2013: Give some get some
 2013: Maradj még
 2015: Velem ma éjjel
 2015: Gömbölyű
 2017: Jericho

Chart-topping singles

Theatre roles 
From the Színházi adattár.

See also
X-Faktor 2011

Further information
Muri Enikő hivatalos honlapja
Muri Enikő profilja a 2011-es X-Faktor hivatalos oldaláról
Muri Enikő hivatalos Facebook-oldala

References

1990 births
Living people
21st-century Hungarian women singers
People from Nyíregyháza